Ghubaira, alternatively at times al-Ghubairah is a subject of Baladiyah al-Batha and a residential neighborhood located west of al-Khalidiyyah and south of al-Oud in southern Riyadh, Saudi Arabia. Inhabited mostly by Afro-Arabs and overseas Sudanese nationals, it is considered among the most crime-infested and unhygienic neighborhoods of Riyadh.

References 

Neighbourhoods in Riyadh